Harry Joseph Warren (born May 31, 1950 in East Liverpool, Ohio) is a Human Resource Specialist and Republican member of the North Carolina House of Representatives. He has represented the 76th district (and the preceding 77th district) (including constituents in Rowan County) since 2011.

Biography
Warren graduated from Kent State University in 1972 with a bachelor's degree in Political Science. In 1969, he married the former Beverly Rizer. They were married for 20 years and had 4 children together. He is currently married to Catherine Warren. He has six children total.

Before election to the NC House of Representatives, Warren worked as a Human Resources Specialist for Tar Heel Capital Corp., one of the largest Wendy's restaurant franchises. He is a member of First United Methodist Church in Salisbury, North Carolina.

North Carolina House of Representatives
Warren was Chairman of the House Select Committee on the State's Role in Immigration Policy and Vice-Chairman of the Government committee.

Committee assignments

2021-2022 session
State Personnel (Chair)
Election Law and Campaign Finance Reform (Vice Chair)
Finance (Vice Chair)
Local Government - Land Use, Planning and Development (Vice Chair)
Families, Children, and Aging Policy
Insurance
Redistricting
State Government
Transportation

2019-2020 session
Finance (Chair)
State and Local Government Committee (Chair)
Election Law and Campaign Finance Reform (Vice Chair)
Commerce and Job Development
Insurance
Transportation

2017-2018 session
State Personnel (Chair)
Elections and Ethics Law (Vice Chair)
Finance (Vice Chair)
State and Local Government I
Judiciary IV

2015-2016 session
Public Utilities (Chair)
Elections (Vice Chair)
Finance (Vice Chair)
Insurance
Local Government
Judiciary IV
Aging

2013-2014 session
State and Local Government (Chair)
Public Utilities (Vice Chair)
Finance
Insurance
Commerce and Job Development
Education

2011-2012 session
Government (Vice Chair)
Public Utilities
Finance
Insurance
Commerce and Job Development
Education

Electoral history

2020

2018

2016

2014

2012
Warren faced no primary challenge. He went on to meet retired minister Bill Battermann (who also was unopposed in Democratic primary) in the general election. Warren defeated Battermann 61% to 38%.

2010
In 2010, Harry Warren defeated school teacher Lauren Raper in the Republican primary. He then faced incumbent Democratic incumbent Lorene Coates in the general election. Less than 200 votes separated the candidates on election day. Because of this, losing candidate Lorene Coates asked for a recount. After the recount, Harry Warren was confirmed the victor.

References

External links
Legislative profile - NC General Assembly website
Campaign website

|-

Living people
1950 births
People from East Liverpool, Ohio
People from Salisbury, North Carolina
Kent State University alumni
21st-century American politicians
Republican Party members of the North Carolina House of Representatives